Foreign relations were officially established in 1992. Azerbaijan appreciates Indonesia's support in international forums on Azerbaijan position regarding the Nagorno-Karabakh conflict.  Azerbaijan has an embassy in Jakarta while Indonesia has an embassy in Baku. Both nations are the member of Organization of Islamic Cooperation and Non Aligned Movement.

History

After the dissolution of the Soviet Union, Indonesia recognized the independence of the Republic of Azerbaijan on December 28, 1991. Almost a year later the diplomatic relations between the two countries were officially established on September 24, 1992. On February 12, 2006, the embassy of Azerbaijan was established Jakarta, it was the first Azerbaijan embassy in Southeast Asia. Indonesia reciprocated on December 29, 2010 by opening their embassy in Baku.

Economy and trade
The trade between Azerbaijan and Indonesia is mostly related to the energy sector, as Azerbaijan emerged as the second biggest supplier of crude oil to Indonesia in 2011 after Saudi Arabia. The bilateral trade between Azerbaijan and Indonesia reached US$101.10 million in 2007 and increased to US$1.76 billion in 2011. The trade balance is heavily in favour to Azerbaijan, as the trade volume mainly dominated by Indonesian imports for Azerbaijan's oil.

Culture
In 2010, the Azerbaijan University of Languages (AUL) established the Center of Indonesian Studies. This institution promotes the understanding and study on Indonesian language and culture for Azerbaijani students. In April 2012, the Center of Indonesian Studies of AUL in cooperation with Indonesian Embassy in Baku had a batik workshop and exhibition, featuring Javanese batik designer from Yogyakarta as the key speaker. This event was meant to promote the cultural exchange between two countries.

Aid
In March 2021, the Azerbaijani government allocated $50,000 in aid to Indonesia to deal with the consequences of the earthquake that struck West Sulawesi in January.

See also 
 Foreign relations of Azerbaijan 
 Foreign relations of Indonesia

External links
 The Embassy of Republic of Indonesia in Baku, Azerbaijan
 Azerbaijan Embassy in Jakarta, Indonesia

References

 
Azerbaijan–Indonesia relations 
Bilateral relations of Indonesia
Indonesia